Eduardo Sangalang Magat (13 October 1919 – 8 November 1986), better known by his stage name Eddie del Mar, was a Filipino actor, screenwriter, director, and movie producer, particularly noted for his portrayals of Philippine national figures such as Andres Bonifacio, José Rizal, and the fictional Crisostomo Ibarra. He also starred in films with social issue theme.

Filmography
1947 – Ang Kapilya sa May Daang Bakal, Sampaguita Pictures
1948 – Kaputol ng Isang Awit, Sampaguita
1949 – Ulilang Kalapati, Sampaguita
1949 – Ang Lumang Simbahan, Nolasco Bros.
1949 – Damit Pangkasal, Sampaguita
1949 – Pinaghating Isangdaan, Sampaguita
1949 – Ang Kampeon, Sampaguita
1950 – Kilabot sa Makiling, Sampaguita
1950 – Pedro, Pablo, Juan at Jose, Luis F. Nolasco
1950 – Huramentado, Liwayway
1950 – The Spell, Lebran
1951 – Makapili, Liwayway
1951 – Taimtim na Dalangin, Atheca
1951 – Dinukot, Liwayway
1952 – Malolos, Premiere
1952 – Trubador, Manuel Vistan Jr.
1953 – Agilang Itim, Premiere
1953 – Sa Kamay ng Tadhana, Larry Santiago
1954 – Lourdes, Balatbat-Flores
1954 – Is My Guy, All Star
1954 – Pusong Ginto, Deegar Cinema Inc.
1954 – Sex Gang, Deegar Cinema Inc.
1954 – Bandolero, Superior
1955 – Guerero, Premiere
1955 – Bandilang Pula, Bonifer
1955 – Magia Blanca, Larry Santiago
1956 – Santa Lucia, People's
1956 – Buhay at Pag-ibig ni Dr. Jose Rizal, Balatbat & Bagumbayan
1957 – Kim, C.Santiago Film Org
1957 – Bicol Express, Premiere
1957 – Reyna Sirkera, Everlasting
1957 – Tokyo 1960, C.Santiago Fil Org
1958 – Obra-Maestra, People's
1958 – Impiyerno sa Paraiso, Everlasting
1959 – Kilabot sa Makiling
1961 – Noli Me Tángere
1962 – Sino ang Matapang
1964 – Andres Bonifacio: Ang Supremo
1986 – Tinik sa Dibdib

References

External links

1919 births
1986 deaths
Kapampangan people
20th-century Filipino male actors